The governor of Santa Cruz is the head of government of the Bolivian department of Santa Cruz. Established by the 2009 Constitution of Bolivia, the office of governor superseded the office of prefect, which was historically appointed by the president of Bolivia but in 2005 was made subject to popular will by election. The governor is eligible to be elected to two five-year terms, but must resign from office six months in advance of an election if they wish to be consecutively reelected.

Three individuals have held the office of governor of Santa Cruz since its creation in 2010. Rubén Costas, the first popularly elected prefect but last to serve in that role, took office as the first governor on 30 May 2010. Costas was the longest-serving governor, serving a cumulative 10 years and 5 months between his two terms. Ruth Lozada was the first woman to hold the governorship, serving as acting governor while Costas sought reelection. The current governor is Luis Fernando Camacho, who took office on 3 May 2021.

List of governors

References 

2010 establishments in Bolivia
Governors of Santa Cruz